Synaphe fuscalis is a species of moth of the family Pyralidae. It was described by Hans Georg Amsel in 1966 and is found in Morocco.

References

Moths described in 1966
Pyralini
Endemic fauna of Morocco
Moths of Africa